Elisa Iorio (born 21 March 2003) is an Italian artistic gymnast and was a member of the team who won the bronze medal at the 2019 World Championships in Stuttgart. Iorio also won gold at the 2018 European Junior Championships where she additionally won bronze on the balance beam. She is a member of the Italian National Team.

Early life
Iorio was born in Modena, Italy in 2003. In 2017 she moved to Brescia to train at the International Academy of Brixia.

Gymnastics career

Junior

2016 - 2017 
Iorio made her international debut at the 2016 City of Jesolo Trophy where she placed 15th in the all-around.

In 2017 Iorio competed at International Gymnix where she placed 6th in the all-around and won bronze on the uneven bars. She later competed at the 2017 City of Jesolo Trophy where she won gold on the uneven bars and placed 6th in the all-around. Iorio competed at the 2017 Mediterranean Junior Championships where she won gold in the all-around, on vault, and in the team finals. She also won silver on the balance beam. In July she competed at the 2017 European Youth Olympic Festival where she placed fourth in the all-around, first on uneven bars, and second in the team final.  Iorio later competed at the Italian National Championships where she became the national champion

2018
Iorio competed at the City of Jesolo Trophy in April. Italy placed first in the team competition. Iorio competed at the 2018 European Women's Artistic Gymnastics Championships alongside Asia D'Amato, Alice D'Amato, Alessia Federici, and Giorgia Villa where Italy won team gold. Individually Iorio won balance beam bronze.

Senior

2019
In April Iorio was officially named to the team to compete at the 2019 European Championships alongside Villa and the D'Amato twins.  During qualifications she placed fourteenth in the all-around but did not advance to the finals due to teammates Alice D'Amato and Giorgia Villa scoring higher.

In August Iorio competed at the Heerenveen Friendly where she helped Italy win gold in the team competition ahead of the Netherlands and Norway and individually she finished eighth in the all-around.  On September 4 Iorio was named to the team to compete at the 2019 World Championships in Stuttgart, Germany alongside Alice D'Amato, Asia D'Amato, Giorgia Villa, and Desirée Carofiglio.

During qualifications at the 2019 World Championships Iorio helped Italy qualify to the team final in eighth place; as a result Italy also qualified to the 2020 Olympic Games in Tokyo.  Individually she qualified to the all-around final in 18th place. In the team final, Iorio helped Italy win the bronze medal – Italy's first team medal since the 1950 World Artistic Gymnastics Championships.  They ended up finishing behind the United States and Russia but ahead of China, who originally qualified to the final in second place.  During the all-around final Iorio competed on three events before she hurt her ankle on vault and withdrew from the competition.

2020 
Iorio competed at the first Italian Serie A competition where she recorded the second highest score on the uneven bars.  In September she suffered an injury to her ankle ligaments and would be out of training for four months while she recovers from surgery.

2021 
Iorio returned to competition at the 2021 Italian national championships where she only competed on balance beam and uneven bars, the latter of which she won gold.  Although she was not sufficiently recovered enough to be selected to represent Italy at the Olympic Games, she was selected to compete at the 2021 World Championships.  While there she qualified to the uneven bars final and was the second reserve for the balance beam final.  She ended up placing sixth on uneven bars.  Iorio was the third ever Italian gymnast to compete in an uneven bars final at a World Championships after Vanessa Ferrari (2006, 2007) and Serena Licchetta (2009).

2022 
Iorio competed at the DTB Pokal Mixed Cup in March; she contributed scores on uneven bars and balance beam towards Italy's third place finish.  In October Iorio was named to the team to compete at the World Championships in Liverpool alongside Alice D'Amato, Giorgia Villa, Martina Maggio, Manila Esposito, and Veronica Mandriota.

Competitive history

References

External links
 

2003 births
Living people
Italian female artistic gymnasts
Medalists at the World Artistic Gymnastics Championships
European champions in gymnastics
Sportspeople from Modena
21st-century Italian women